The following is a partial list of dams in Zimbabwe.

List of dams (reservoirs)

See also
 List of rivers of Zimbabwe

References

External links

 Major dams map (before 1980)

 
Zimbabwe
Dams and reservoirs